More Than Superhuman is a collection of science fiction short stories by Canadian-American writer A.E. van Vogt, published in 1971.

Contents
"Humans, Go Home"
"The Reflected Men"
"All the Loving Androids"
"Laugh, Clone, Laugh" (with Forrest J Ackerman)
"Research Alpha" (with James H. Schmitz)
"Him"

Short story collections by A. E. van Vogt
1971 short story collections
1970s science fiction works
American short story collections